The Political Constitution of 1899, informally known as the Malolos Constitution, was the constitution of the First Philippine Republic. It was written by Felipe Calderón y Roca and Felipe Buencamino as an alternative to a pair of proposals to the Malolos Congress by Apolinario Mabini and Pedro Paterno. After a lengthy debate in the latter part of 1898, it was promulgated on January 21, 1899.

The constitution placed limitations on unsupervised freedom of action by the chief executive which would have hampered rapid decision making. As it was created during the fight for Philippine independence from Spain, however, its Article 99 allowed unhampered executive freedom of action during wartime. Unsupervised executive governance continued throughout the Philippine–American War which erupted soon after proclamation.

History

Background

After over 300 years of Spanish rule, the country developed from a small overseas colony governed from the Viceroyalty of New Spain to a land with modern elements in the cities. The Spanish-speaking middle classes of the 19th century were increasingly exposed to modern European ideas, including Liberalism, some studying in Spain and elsewhere in Europe.

During the 1890s, the Katipunan, or KKK, a secret society dedicated to achieving Philippine independence from Spain, was formed and led by Andres Bonifacio.  When the KKK was discovered by Spanish authorities, Bonifacio issued the Cry of Balintawak which began the Philippine Revolution in 1896. The revolutionary forces took steps to form a functioning government called the Republic of Biak-na-Bato. In 1897, the Tejeros Convention was convened and the Constitution of Biak-na-Bato drafted and ratified. It was drafted by Isabelo Artacho and Félix Ferrer and based on the first Constitution of Cuba. However, it was never fully implemented. After several battles between the Spanish and Philippine Revolutionary Army, a truce was signed called the Pact of Biak-na-Bato in 1897. Emilio Aguinaldo (who had replaced Bonfiacio as leader) and other revolutionary leaders accepted a payment from Spain and went into exile in Hong Kong.

When the Spanish–American War broke out on April 25, 1898, the United States Commodore George Dewey aboard the  sailed from Hong Kong to Manila Bay leading the Asiatic Squadron of the U.S. Navy.  On May 1, 1898, the American force defeated the Spanish in the Battle of Manila Bay. Later that month, the U.S. Navy transported Aguinaldo back to the Philippines.

Aguinaldo took control of the newly re-formed Philippine revolutionary forces and quickly surrounded Manila on land while the American blockaded the city from the bay.  On June 12, Aguinaldo issued the Philippine Declaration of Independence and followed that with several decrees forming the First Philippine Republic. Elections were held from June 23 to September 10, 1898 for a new national legislature, the Malolos Congress.

Drafting a basic law
After the Malolos Congress was convened on September 15, 1898, a committee was selected to draft a constitution for the republic. The committee was composed of Hipólito Magsalin, Basilio Teodoro, José Albert, Joaquín González, Gregorio Araneta, Pablo Ocampo, Aguedo Velarde, Higinio Benitez, Tomás del Rosario, José Alejandrino, Alberto Barretto, José Ma. de la Viña, José Luna, Antonio Luna, Mariano Abella, Juan Manday, Felipe Calderón, Arsenio Cruz and Felipe Buencamino. They were all wealthy and well educated.

Ratification

The document
The Political Constitution of 1899 is written in Spanish which was the official language of the Philippines at the time. It is composed of one hundred one articles divided into fourteen titles, with transitory provisions in eight further articles, and with one un-numbered additional article.

Influences
The style of the document is patterned after the Spanish Constitution of 1812, which many Latin American charters from the same period similarly follow. Calderón himself writes in his journal that the charters of Belgium, Mexico, Brazil, Nicaragua, Costa Rica, and Guatemala, in addition to using the French Constitution of 1793, were also studied as these countries shared similar social, political, ethnological, and governance conditions with the Philippine Islands.

Constitutional ideas

Retroversion of sovereignty to the people
The principle of the retroversion of the sovereignty to the people, which challenged the legitimacy of the colonial authorities of the Spanish Empire, was the legal principle underlying the Spanish American wars of independence and Philippine Revolution.  This principle was a preprocessor to the concept of popular sovereignty, currently expressed in most constitutional systems throughout the world, whereby the people delegate governmental functions to their civil servants while retaining the actual sovereignty.

This concept of the precedence of popular sovereignty over the national sovereignty is derived from the French political document, the Declaration of the Rights of Man and Citizen of 1793 (French: Déclaration des droits de l'Homme et du citoyen de 1793) and forms the philosophical basis for article 4 of the Malolos Constitution and echoes the American Declaration of Independence and the United States Constitution.

Civil liberties in the Spanish tradition
The twenty-seven articles of Title IV detail the natural rights and popular sovereignty of Filipinos.  The list is extensive, encompassing not just civil liberties and negative liberties, but also protections against self-incrimination and the limitation of criminal procedure. The inclusion of the rights of the accused in the national charter was done in direct response to numerous instances of abuse by police, a number of them specifically mentioned in the June 12, 1898 Philippine Declaration of Independence. This concept of constitutionally defining what is essentially administrative action is not unique to the Malolos constitution. In fact, the right defined in the Filipino charter is actually a shorter enumeration of the civil and political rights of the Spanish citizen enshrined in the liberal Spanish Constitution of 1869 which brought liberalism into the public consciousness and inspired a generation of national heroes starting with governor-general Carlos María de la Torre and secular priest José Burgos, and later including Galicano Apacible y Castillo, Graciano López y Jaena, Marcelo Hilario del Pilar y Gatmaitán and José Rizal. Calderón mentions in his journal that the draft constitution was meant to enshrine: "all those freedoms that Englishmen enjoyed in the Assize of Clarendon (end to arbitrary arrest, a professional and independent judiciary) and in Magna Carta (due process of law)".

According to Title III, Article 5 of the Malolos constitution: "The State recognizes the freedom and equality of all beliefs, as well as the separation of Church and State."

Form of government
According to Title II, Article 4 the Government of the Republic is to be popular, representative, alternative and responsible, and shall exercise three distinct powers: namely, the legislative, the executive, and the judicial. Any two or more of these three powers shall never be united in one person or cooperation, nor the legislative power vested in one single individual. The Government of the Republic is a Responsible Government, a very important aspect of parliamentarianism where the executive branch is directly responsible to the legislative branch. This is further emphasized in Title V, Article 50 and Title VII, Article 56.

Title V, Article 50 stated that the National Assembly of Representatives (the unicameral legislature of the Republic) shall have the right of censure and each of the members the right of interpellation. Interpellation is a right granted to representatives to directly question members of the executive branch. In other words, there are Question Periods allotted to each member of the executive branch. While Title VII, Article 56 stated that executive power resides in the President of the Republic, who shall exercise it through his Secretaries convened in a Council of government that is led by the President of the council of government. The Constitution also stated in Title IX, Article 75 that the secretaries of government shall be held jointly responsible by the National Assembly for the general policies of Government, and individually for their personal actions like in most parliamentary systems.

The parliamentary terminologies used in this constitution are different to the more usual Anglo-Saxon titles. Terms like Parliament, Cabinet, Prime Minister, Minister, and Member of Parliament (or MP) are replaced with Assembly, Council of Government, President of the Council of Government, Secretary, and Representative, respectively.

Permanent Commission
The Permanent Commission is created to make decisions when the National Assembly is in recess. The National Assembly is empowered to elect seven of its members to constitute the Permanent Commission, with the obligation that the Commission choose a President and a Secretary on its first session. The Permanent Commission powers were:
1. Declare whether or not there is sufficient cause to take legal action against the President of the Republic, the Representatives, the Secretaries of Government, the President of the Supreme Court of Justice, and the Solicitor General in the cases provided for in this Constitution;
2. Convene the Assembly in extraordinary session in cases when the Court of Justice must be constituted;
3. Act on matters that have remained unresolved in order for them to be taken into consideration;
4. Convene the Assembly in extraordinary sessions when the exigency of the case so requires; and
5. Substitute the National Assembly in the exercise of its powers in accordance to the Constitution, except in the power of creating and passing laws. The Permanent Commission shall meet whenever it is convened by whoever presides over it in accordance to this Constitution.

Translations
The original was written in Spanish, which became the first official language of the Philippines and a number of translations have been published.

Legacy
The First Philippine Republic never gained international recognition and the Malolos Constitution was never fully implemented across the Philippines.

Following Spain's defeat in the Spanish–American War, the United States in the Treaty of Paris of 1898 acquired the Philippines from Spain, along with several other territories. On February 4, 1899, the Philippine–American War started with the Battle of Manila of 1899. On March 23, 1901, Aguinaldo was captured.  On April 19, he issued a Proclamation of Formal Surrender to the United States, telling his followers to lay down their weapons and give up the fight. General Miguel Malvar took over the leadership of the Filipino government, or what remained of it. Malvar surrendered, along with his sick wife and children and some of his officers, on April 13, 1902.

Beginning with the Philippine Organic Act of 1902 the United States Congress passed a number of so-called organic acts in the American constitutional tradition which acted like constitutions for the colonial Insular Government. Eventually, the Tydings–McDuffie Act of 1934 was passed leading to the 1935 Constitution of the Commonwealth of the Philippines and subsequent charters, including the present 1987 Constitution. These were written in the American constitutional tradition and based upon American constitutional principles, often lifting wording directly from the Constitution of the United States and other American sources. The Malolos Constitution, rooted in Spanish constitutionalism, has had limited influence on subsequent Philippine constitutions, rooted in American constitutionalism.

Isagani Giron, a past president of the Samahang Pangkasaysayan ng Bulacan (Historical Society of Bulacan; SAMPAKA), described the Malolos Constitution as "the best Constitution the country ever had".

The original copy of the Malolos Constitution is kept in the historical archives of the Batasang Pambansa Complex, the current seat of the House of Representatives of the Philippines. The document is not available for public viewing.

See also
 Constitutionalism
 Constitution of the Philippines

References

External links

 A collection of Philippine Constitutions
 The 1899 Malolos Constitution in Spanish with a side-by-side English translation
 Biak-na-Bato Constitution
 Official Website of Barasoain Church

Philippines, 1899
First Philippine Republic
Legal history of the Philippines
Political history of the Philippines
Constitutions of the Philippines
1898 documents